The Tepecano language is an extinct indigenous language of Mexico belonging to the Uto-Aztecan language-family. It was formerly spoken by a small group of people in Azqueltán (earlier Atzqueltlán), Jalisco, a small village on the Río Bolaños in the far northern part of the state, just east of the territory of the Huichol people. Most closely related to Southern Tepehuán of the state of Durango, Tepecano was a Mesoamerican language and evinced many of the traits that define the Mesoamerican Linguistic Area.  So far as is known, the last speaker of Tepecano was Lino de la Rosa (born September 22, 1895), who was still living as of February 1980.

Research on Tepecano was first carried out by the American linguistic anthropologist John Alden Mason in Azqueltán from 1911 to 1913. This work led to the publication of a monographic grammatical sketch in 1916 as well as an article on native prayers in Tepecano that Mason had collected from informants in 1918.  Later field-research was conducted by American linguist Dennis Holt in 1965 and from 1979 to 80, but none of his results have so far been published.

Morphology
Tepecano is an agglutinative language, where words use suffix complexes for a variety of purposes with several morphemes strung together.

Notes

Bibliography

 
 
 
 

Agglutinative languages
Piman languages
Mesoamerican languages
Extinct languages of North America
Indigenous languages of Mexico
Languages extinct in the 20th century
20th-century disestablishments in North America